Akelarre is a Basque term meaning Witches' Sabbath.

Akelarre may also refer to:

 Akelarre (Criminal album), 2011
 Akelarre (Lola Índigo album), 2019
 Akelarre (cipher), a block cipher
 Akelarre (film), a 1984 Spanish film by Pedro Olea
 Akelarre (restaurant), a Basque restaurant that has achieved three Michelin stars
 Akelarre, a 2020 Spanish drama film also known as Coven
 Aquelarre (band), a former Argentinian rock group
 El aquelarre, an oil mural by Francisco Goya also known as Witches' Sabbath (The Great He-Goat)
 Aquelarre (role-playing game), a medieval demoniacal fantasy role-playing game
 Aquelarre (TV series), a Chilean television drama series

See also
 Witches' Sabbath (disambiguation)